JDS Yashiro (MSC-603) was the only ship of its type of minesweeper of Japan Maritime Self-Defense Force (JMSDF).

Construction and career 
Yashiro was laid down on 22 June 1955 and launched on 26 March 1956 by Nippon Kokan Keihin Shipyard. She was commissioned on 10 July 1956 and on September 1, the same year, the 31st Mine Warfare Group was newly formed in Kure District Force, and she was incorporated with JDS Atada and JDS Itsuki.

On 16 March 1957, the 31st Mine Warfare Group was reorganized under the 1st Mine Warfare Force.

On 15 March 1969, the 31st Mine Warfare Group was reorganized into the Kure District Force.

On 2 March 1970, the 31st Mine Warfare Group was reorganized into the Hanshin Base Corps under the Kure District Force.

On 31 March 1972, she was changed to an auxiliary ship, her registration number was changed to YAS-58, and she was transferred to the Kure District Force.

She was decommissioned on March 18, 1981.

Citations 

Ships built in Japan
1956 ships
Minesweepers of the Japan Maritime Self-Defense Force